The 1833 Treaty of Chicago struck an agreement between the United States government that required the Chippewa, Odawa, and Potawatomi tribes cede to the United States government their  of land (including reservations) in Illinois, the Wisconsin Territory, and the Michigan Territory and to move west of the Mississippi River. In return, the tribes were given promises of various cash payments and tracts of land west of the Mississippi River. The treaty was one of the removal treaties to come after the passage of the Indian Removal Act. This was the second treaty referred to as the "Treaty of Chicago", after the 1821 Treaty of Chicago.

Background
The negotiation of the cession treaty came roughly three years after the United States federal government ratified the Indian Removal Act. While many cession treaties had previously been negotiated between the United States government and Native American tribes during the late 18th century and early 19th century, those that were negotiated after the ratification of the Indian Removal Act differed by usually including stipulations which required that the Native American tribes party to the treaty move west of the Mississippi River. In such post-Indian Removal Act cession treaties, the United States Government agreed to compensate tribes for their lands, liquidate their debts, and assist them in establishing a new permanent settlement west of the Mississippi. The Chicago Treaty of 1833 was typical of such treaties.

One of the impetuses for the treaty were rumors in the aftermath of the 1832 Black Hawk War that Native Americans were coming into conflict with settlers arriving in Illinois. The number of settlers arriving in Illinois and its surrounding area in search of farmland had increased after the 1825 opening of the  Erie Canal made possible an easier route to Illinois from the Eastern United States. Illinois residents pressured the government to remove the Indians from the land they occupied in the state, thereby making it available to settlers. One of the ways in which they applied pressure was by making regular reports complaining of misconduct and hostility from the Native people. These reports were relayed by John Reynolds to the United States Department of War. The reports that Reynolds delivered and the reports made by  investigators that Reynolds tasked with examining this state of affairs were founded entirely on second-hand accounts. Officials that were closer to the situation gave accounts that contradict the reports of native misconduct and aggression.  Thomas Jefferson Vance Owen (the United States government's Indian agent in Chicago as well as the president of the Chicago Town Board of Trustees), General Winfield Scott, and George Bryan Porter (the territorial governor of Michigan) all communicated to the Office of Indian Affairs that the rumors and newspaper stories covering them were untrue and unfair.

In early 1833, the Office of Indian Affairs began exploring the prospect of removing the Potawatomi. Herring, Lewis Cass (the United States secretary of war) several figures to find land which could be used to house removed Potawatomi, Odawa, and Chippewa  populations, "should they consent to remove."  Among those to receive such instructions were Montfort Stokes, Henry Leavitt Ellsworth, and John F. Schermerhorn, the latter of whom been involved in the relocation of the Potawatomi of Indiana to land west of the Mississippi River.

In a March 5, 1833, letter, Chicago Indian Agent Owen told Elbert Herring (the commissioner of indian affairs) that, after having spoken with the, "most intelligent and influential" native chiefs he had concluded that it was very unlikely that they would agree to cede all of their lands. His letter declared that he believed that they could be induced to move west only if they were first permitted to have a delegation travel to inspect the land they would be moving to first, and that the would be, "unwilling to make any exchange until they are satisfied of the fact that their new home and country possessed advantages not inferior to those incident to" they land they already occupied. The opined that Potawatomi land cession would be expansive to secure. A copy of this letter was also sent to Michigan Territory Governor Porter, who expressed the belief that the spending of great expenses would be justified if it secured the cession of the Potawatomi from their lands. Porter also believed that the government would be able to recoup their expense when they would sell the land to settlers. Porter also suggested that it could be possible for Michigan Territory to secure a cession of the few remaining plots of land in the territory still controlled by Native Americans.

Negotiations
The federal government decided for there to be treaty negotiations with the Potawatomi, Odawa, Chippewa and Kickapoo natives. The then-town of Chicago in the state of Illinois was selected as the site for a treaty to be negotiated, as it had already long established itself as a consequential trading center, was home to the Fort Dearborn garrison, and was a traditional Potawatomi resort. On April 6, 1833, Commissioner of Indian Affairs Herring informed Chicago Indian Agent Owen that the United States Congress had approved the appropriation of $10,000 needed to hold the treaty negotiations.  Owen took charge of planning the meeting. In preparation for the meeting, a large open arbor was built in Chicago at the corner of Rush Street and Michigan Avenue to be used as a council house during the meeting.

On April 8, 1866, Secretary of War Cass appointed the commissioners for the negotiations, naming Michigan Territory Governor Porter, Chicago Indian Agent Thomas Jefferson Vance Owen, and Colonel William Weatherford. Weatherford, who served to represent the people of Illinois in the investigation, ultimately played a relatively negligible role in the negotiations. Secretary Cass instructed the commissioners to work to secure the clearance of the entire region of Native American land claims. Cass called this objective, 

Cass gave the commissioners warnings that he believed other treasuries for treaties had been excessively expensive, with too many individuals receiving gratuities. Furthermore, Cass declared that no liquor should be involved in the dealings of the treaty's treasury and that its location should be on Native American territory and placed under the protection of the Army's commanding officer at Fort Dearborn.

William Lee D. Ewing served as secretary for the commissioners.

Plans to facilitate the travel of a Native American delegation to inspect land West of the Mississippi ahead of the negotiations were scrapped after appropriations for such an undertaking failed to come through. Porter, who believed that this would increase the difficulty of negotiating the treaty, requested in an August 23, 1833, to John F. Schermerhorn that Schermerhorn travel to Chicago to help with the negotiations by sharing his expert knowledge about land West of the Mississippi. Schermerhorn would come to during the meetings, staying from September 22 through September 26, 1833.

During the meeting, it was estimated that 3,000 out-of-town visitors descended on Chicago, including Native Americans, government officials, troops of the United States Army, land speculators, and other travelers to witness the proceedings unfold. At the time, Chicago was just a small village with merely 150 buildings. Thousands of Native Americans descended on the city in the week that the meeting started. Among the non-Natives who came to Chicago were who saw the trial as important to the interests of their personal profit, including, "men pursuing Indian claims, some for tracts of land,...creditors of the tribes, or of particular Indians, who know that they have no chance of getting their money, if they do not get it from Government agents." While traders worked hard to influence the treaty, it appears that they had very little influence on the actual terms reached. During the meeting, there was much unruliness among the many visitors who had flocked to the city.

The meeting was held between September 10 and October 7, 1833. Formal proceedings of negotiations were originally scheduled to begin on September 12, 1833. However, the Native Americans, who were in no hurry to start the assembly, caused this to be delayed and the first day of the council for the negotiations was held on September 14. At the beginning of the proceedings, a fire was kindled inside of the council house and a peace pipe was passed between the federal government's commissioners and the chief and head men of the Native tribes.

While the natives were against the cession of their land, it was clear from past experiences that the United States government would not take "no" for an answer once it decided it wanted to see Natives cede their land. Therefore, the Natives likely saw it as in their best interests to strike a bargain, despite their desire to remain on their existing lands.

An initial version of the treaty was agreed to on September 26, 1833. Supplementary articles were agreed to the following day. After the treaty was agreed to, the commissioners gave medals to a number of Native chiefs. From September 30 through October 4, 1833, the commissioners examined claims that individuals held against the Natives. From October 5 through October 6, they created a statement of their accounts and checked invoices.

Porter, who had been enthusiastic in his role in creating and finalizing the treaty, wrote a letter to Lewis Cass to report the completion of the treaty. In it, he also suggested that the United States act fast to remove from Native possession remaining small reservations, "thus this whole country may probably be altogether relieved from any serious impediment to its entire settlement, by the removal of a population which will always embarrass and retard it."

Signatories and witnesses

Stipulations
 of land were ceded to the United States government in the treaty. The treaty stipulated that the Odawa, Chippewa, and Potawatomi would cede their lands in Illinois, the Wisconsin Territory, and the Michigan Territory in exchange for a sum of presents, certain annuities, liquidation of all their debt, and a tract of equal size in the Kansas Territory along the Missouri River where they were required to move within three years. The Potawatomi were the largest tribe in regards to population residing West of the Mississippi among the three tribes that were party to the treaty. The sum promised to the tribes was unprecedented for such a treaty. The treaty marked the cession of what was the last immense tract of Native American land that remained north of the Ohio River and east of the Mississippi River. This marked a landmark in accomplishing the Indian removal goals being pursued by President Andrew Jackson and the Office of Indian Affairs.

Ratification and implementation
Commissioner of Indian Affairs Herring and Secretary of War Cass, considered the treaty to be a significant success for the United States. Herring told the opening of the Fall 1833 session of the United States Congress that, 

In a report to the president, Secretary Cass lauded that the Natives were better off west of the Mississippi, declaring that they were, "comfortable and contented" there. He also celebrated seeing the land north of the Ohio River and West of the Mississippi River, "cleared of the embarrassments of Indian relations."

Despite the glowing endorsements of Secretary Cass and Secretary Herring, it soon became clear that the treaty would face strong opposition within the United States Senate. One reason was that, immediately after the agreement was first reached in 1833, accusations of fraud and foul play alleging schemes to self-enrich were made against individuals that had negotiated the treaty. Another reason was that United States senators felt that Native treaties were beginning to cost too much.

The primary corruption allegation was the allegation that Governor Porter had shown favor to two families with connections to him, the Kinzie's and the Forsyths. Members of these families were to profit a cumulative $100,000 from under terms of the treaty. It looked suspicious that each member of the Kinzie family earned nearly identical sums of money under the treaty's terms. Porters'connection to the Kinzies and Forsyths was further given bad optics with the fact that John J. Kinzie and B. B. Kerchavel (the latter being the husband of Maria Forsyth) had been given a virtual monopoly on furnishing goods to the treaty negotiation meetings, for which they made a 50% profit. Additional, many government officials had been hosted at the Kinzie residence during the negotiations and had well-compensated the Kinzie for these accommodations. Porter made efforts to refute the allegations of wrongdoing.

Finding the Porter's refutations of the corruption allegations satisfactory, President Jackson submitted the treaty to the United States Senate on January 10, 1834, requesting that the Senate give its approval to the treaty. To address the allegations of corruption, Jackson recommended that an individual agent be sent to go to Chicago and investigate the claims there. The Senate referred the treaty to the Senate Committee on Indian Affairs. After giving due consideration to objections to the treaty, the committee decided that there was not a need for them to fight the treaty's ratification. On  April 2, 1834, the committee submitted its report and recommendations to the full Senate.

On October 1, 1834, alterations to the treaty were proposed.

On February 21, 1835, the Senate gave its consent to the treaty.  The treaty was ratified that same day by the signature of President Jackson. The treaty's statute reference is 7 Stat., 431.

On March 3, 1835, federal appropriations for the treaty were approved. The appropriations saw $1,032,689.53 allocated for grants provided by the treaty. A further $2,536.53 was appropriated to pay the balance exceeding the $10,000 previously appropriated to cover the costs incurred in spending related to facilitating the negotiations. $9,453 was appropriated to cover the expenses of an exploratory trip by fifty representatives of the Potawatomi to inspect the land they would be allotted west of the Mississippi.

In accordance with the treaty and the federal government's goals, the United States government acted to carry out the removal of members of the party Native American tribes out of the lands east of the Mississippi. As the treaty was ratified in 1835, it would be by 1838 that the Natives had to leave.

On August 31, 1835, before the residents of Chicago, in an act of defiance ahead of their impending removal, five-hundred Native American warriors gathered in Chicago in full dress and brandishing tomahawks and put on dramatic war dance displays. This was the last recorded war dance in the Chicago area.

Some natives moved to northern Wisconsin, rather than moving west of the Mississippi. For years, only the Potawatomi that had moved west of the Mississippi to Kansas would received the stipulated annuities from the United States government. However, the United States government moved to rectify this in 1913, when it paid the Wisconsin Potawatomi $447,339.

References

External links
 National Archives scan of the treaty and supplemental articles
 National Archives scan of the supplemental articles to the treaty
 Oklahoma State University Library scan of the treaty
 Oklahoma State University Library text of treaty
 Forest County Potawatomi text of treaty
 Kansas Heritage text of treaty
 Internet Archive text of the treaty via JSTOR content
Text of the treaty as compiled and edited by Charles J. Kappler for the United States Government Printing Office in 1904 (available via family search.org)

Chicago
Ojibwe in the United States
Legal history of Michigan
Native American history of Michigan
Native American history of Wisconsin
Native American history of Illinois
Pre-statehood history of Michigan
Pre-statehood history of Wisconsin
Anishinaabe treaty areas
Chicago
History of Chicago
Presidency of Andrew Jackson
1833 in Illinois
1830s in Chicago
1830s controversies in the United States